Mick Kearin (born 9 May 1943 in Kildare) is an Irish former footballer who mainly played as a wing-half, after starting his career as a forward.

He started off with St Patrick's Athletic F.C. at 17 before joining Bohemians F.C. in 1963 as an amateur.

Bohemians struggled in the league, winning a handful of games, but the arrival of Seán Thomas as manager was soon to change things, "It was major news – Sean Thomas had managed Shamrock Rovers and brought them phenomenal success."

There were offers to turn professional and semi-professional by the likes of Derry and Glentoran and Waterford.

"The Derry one I was nearly going to take because it was full-time but Sean Thomas said that Shamrock Rovers was the offer to accept – they were the club in the country – they were in Europe every year." Sean said, "Don't mind these other teams – they can promise you ten pounds a week more than what Rovers are offering, but after a month they mightn't have any money."

In the end he went to Rovers in May 1966  for four times the amount they'd originally offered. The most memorable European tie Mick played in was against FC Bayern Munich in 1966. Rovers drew 1-1 at Dalymount Park but it was the return match played in below freezing temperature in Munich that almost caused German hearts to crash. With a minute to the final whistle the score was 2-2, and qualification was beckoning for Rovers on the away goals rule (this was a Bayern team peppered with World Cup winners like Sepp Maier, Franz Beckenbauer, Gerd Müller – and their club had already sold 40,000 tickets for their next European game – that's how sure they were that Rovers would be a push-over). The silence of the crowd was deafening as they say, the relief palpable when Der Bomber netted the winner.

A six-week summer team to promote the advent of professional soccer in the US in 1967 saw Mick play against South American teams, and also against the likes of Sunderland, Wolves, Hearts and Stoke City amongst others. By now Mick was very well established and written often off in the national newspapers.

His seven-year stay at Glenmalure Park included scoring twice in eight appearances for Rovers in Europe .

Kearin earned one international cap for the Republic of Ireland national football team on 10 October 1971 in a 6-0 defeat to Austria in a European Championship qualifier in the Linzer Stadion . Mick won three amateur caps for the Irish national team: against Scotland home and away, and Iceland away. He represented the League of Ireland XI four times while at Milltown.

He scored in the 1969 FAI Cup final replay .

He rejoined Bohs in January 1973 and later played for Athlone Town F.C.

Honours
FAI Cup: 3
  Shamrock Rovers - 1967, 1968, 1969
League of Ireland Shield
  Shamrock Rovers - 1967/68
Leinster Senior Cup
  Shamrock Rovers - 1968/69
Dublin City Cup
  Shamrock Rovers - 1966/67
Blaxnit Cup
  Shamrock Rovers 1967-68

Sources 
 The Hoops by Paul Doolan and Robert Goggins

Association footballers from County Kildare
Republic of Ireland association footballers
Republic of Ireland international footballers
St Patrick's Athletic F.C. players
Bohemian F.C. players
Shamrock Rovers F.C. players
Athlone Town A.F.C. players
League of Ireland players
United Soccer Association players
Boston Rovers players
Living people
1943 births
League of Ireland XI players
Association football defenders